Rhythmologa polyfenestra is a species of moth of the family Tortricidae. It is found in Zamora-Chinchipe Province, Ecuador.

The wingspan is 18 mm. The ground colour of the forewings is whitish cream, strigulated (finely streaked) with olive grey and slightly mixed with greyish basally. The hindwings are creamish, slightly mixed with brownish ochreous posteriorly.

Etymology
The species name refers to numerous pale spots of ground colour on the forewings and is derived from Greek poly (meaning numerous) and Latin fenestra (meaning window).

References

Moths described in 2009
Euliini